Al Morabito Mosque is an Islamic place of worship in Córdoba, Spain. It was built during the Spanish Civil War as a gift for Franco's Muslim soldiers and is considered Spain's first modern mosque.
After the Spanish Transition and the return of democracy, the Association of Muslims in Cordoba asked the municipal government, then led by the mayor Julio Anguita, to give them the building to perform the congregational prayers. The application was accepted and opened in 1992 again as a mosque.

See also
Islam in Spain

References

Buildings and structures in Córdoba, Spain
Mosques in Spain